Totties is a hamlet between New Mill and Scholes near Holmfirth in West Yorkshire, England.

Although it consists of no more than 70-80 houses, it has within the hamlet three plant and tree nurseries, an egg production facility, and a chicken farm, plus two local football pitches.

Holme Valley
Geography of Kirklees
Hamlets in West Yorkshire
Towns and villages of the Peak District